Shining leaf chafer may refer to:

 Anomala binotata, a scarab beetle in the family Scarabaeidae
 Rutelinae, a subfamily of the scarab beetle family Scarabaeidae

Animal common name disambiguation pages